Abu Talul is a Bedouin township in southern Israel. Located in the Negev desert around ten kilometres east of Beersheba and to the south of highway 25, it falls under the jurisdiction of Neve Midbar Regional Council.

Demography
The township is populated by three large families; Abu Talul, Abu Sulab (Abu Silb) and el-Shihabi. There are also several thousand Bedouin living in the area outside of the organized township.

History
Prior to the establishment of Israel, the Negev Bedouin were a semi-nomadic society going through a process of sedentariness since the Ottoman rule of the region.

During the British Mandate period, the administration did not provide a legal frame to justify and preserve lands’ ownership. In order to settle this issue, Israel’s land policy was adapted to a large extent from the Ottoman land regulations of 1858 as the only preceding legal frame. It enabled Israel to nationalize most of the Negev lands using the state’s land regulations from 1969.

Bedouin settlement
Israel has continued the policy of sedentarization of Negev Bedouins imposed by the Ottoman authorities, and at first it included regulation and re-location - during the 1950s Israel has re-located two-thirds of the Negev Bedouins into an area that was under a martial law. 

The next step was to establish seven townships built especially for Bedouins in order to sedentarize and urbanize them by offering them better life conditions, proper infrastructure and high quality public services in sanitation, health and education, and municipal services. All the more so the rate of the Bedouin population in Israel is among the highest in the world - it doubles its size every 15 years. These townships are: Hura, Lakiya, Ar'arat an-Naqab (Ar'ara BaNegev), Shaqib al-Salam (Segev Shalom), Tel as-Sabi (Tel-Sheva), Kuseife and the city of Rahat, the largest among them). These townships cannot resolve the issue of high population density and illegal construction in the Negev absolutely, so besides expanding existing towns, the Israeli government has decided to construct 13 additional settlements for the Negev Bedouin, and Abu Talul is one of them.

Not all Bedouins agree to move from tents and structures built on the state lands into apartments prepared for them. In permanent planned villages live about 60% of Bedouin citizens of Israel, while the rest - in illegal homes spread all over North Negev subject to demolition and lacking basic services and they refuse to move into the newly built townships with the full basic infrastructure.

Creation
Started as an unrecognized Bedouin village, Abu Talul became an officially approved settlement with the implementation of the government Abu Basma plan. This plan was to find an appropriate solution to the scattered Bedouin communities living without official permits all over the Northern Negev. On February 19, 2006 Abu Talul was recognized officially by the state and became a part of now defunct Abu Basma Regional Council. 

When the Abu Basma Regional Council was dismantled by the Israeli Ministry of Interior order on November 5, 2012, and two new regional councils were created instead, Abu Talul became a part of one of them - Neve Midbar Regional Council.

Infrastructure
In 2012 the township infrastructure was ready only partly.  There were two school buildings, kindergartens, a medical clinic, a perinatal (baby) care center "Tipat Halav", 3 mosques, cemetery and a sports ground.  Seven more objects were to be built in the close future - schools, kindergartens, medical clinics for the convenience of the local public.

Education opportunities
In July 2013 there were three operating elementary schools and one middle school attended by 2400 pupils in Abu Talul. There was also one high school attended by 120 students, half of them girls and half of them boys from the village and its vicinity. The high school consists of 12 caravans. Due to the traditional nature of Arab Bedouin society there is a high drop-out rate, and it is significantly higher among high school-aged girls, than high school-aged boys. The nearest university is situated in Be'er Sheva, Ben-Gurion University of the Negev.

See also

Arab localities in Israel
Bedouin in Israel

References

External links
Abu Talul Abu Basma Regional Council official site 
Lands of the Negev, a short film by Israel Land Administration describing the challenges in providing land management and infrastructure to the Negev Bedouin
Bedouin information Israel Land Administration
Seth Frantzman, Presentation to Regavim about Negev

Arab villages in Israel
Neve Midbar Regional Council
Populated places established in 2006
Populated places in Southern District (Israel)
2006 establishments in Israel